The 1950 municipal election was held November 1, 1950 to elect five aldermen to sit on Edmonton City Council.  The electorate also decided eleven plebiscite questions.  There was no mayoral election, as Sidney Parsons was on the second year of a two year-term.  There were no elections for school trustees, as candidates for both the public and separate school boards were acclaimed.

There were ten aldermen on city council, but five of the positions were already filled: Harold Tanner (SS), Armour Ford, Rupert Clare, Kenneth Lawson, and William Hawrelak (SS) were all elected to two-year terms in 1949 and were still in office.

There were seven trustees on the public school board, but four of the positions were already filled:
George Brown, Mary Butterworth (SS), J W K Shortreed, and John Thorogood (SS) had been acclaimed to two-year terms in 1949 and were still in office.  The same was true on the separate board, where Joseph Gallant, Lawrence Keylor (SS), Ambrose O'Neill, and Joseph Pilon were continuing.

Voter turnout

There were 27,484 ballots cast out of 93,406 eligible voters, for a voter turnout of 29.4%.

Results

 bold or  indicates elected
 italics indicate incumbent
 "SS", where data is available, indicates representative for Edmonton's South Side, with a minimum South Side representation instituted after the city of Strathcona, south of the North Saskatchewan River, amalgamated into Edmonton on February 1, 1912.

Aldermen

Public school trustees

Harry Fowler, Robert Rae, and Charles Cummins were acclaimed.

Separate (Catholic) school trustees

Adrian Crowe (SS), Francis Killeen, and James O'Hara were acclaimed.

Plebiscites

 Financial plebiscite items required a minimum two-thirds "Yes" majority to bring about action

Civic Centre

Are you in favour of the City entering into the proposed agreement with the First New Amsterdam Corporation for development of the Civic Centre area as finally approved by City Council on September 29, 1950?
Yes - 11,843
No - 7,641

Paving

Shall Council pass a bylaw creating a debenture debt in the sum of $1,225,095.00 for City share of paving of arterial streets, bus routes and elsewhere?
Yes - 16,442
No - 1,478

High Level Bridge

Shall Council pass a bylaw creating a debenture debt in the sum of $500,000.00 to be applied toward the cost of providing a four lane vehicular traffic deck on the High Level Bridge to relieve serious traffic congestion?
Yes - 9,174
No - 8,588

Equipment for Engineers' Department

Shall Council pass a bylaw creating a debenture debt in the sum of $100,000.00 to purchase equipment for the Engineers’ Department including a flusher, a sweeper, mud pump and grader?
Yes - 14,432
No - 2,741

Fire Department

Shall Council pass a bylaw creating a debenture debt in the sum of $175,000.00 for the erection of Fire Department Buildings, namely, fire hall at Jasper Avenue and 92 Street, one drill tower and one drill school utility building for training firemen?
Yes - 15,147
No - 2,230

Fire Fighting Equipment

Shall Council pass a bylaw creating a debenture debt in the sum of $76,000.00 to purchase equipment for the Fire Department consisting of two pumpers and one aerial ladder?
Yes - 15,971
No - 1,499

Police Station

Shall Council pass a bylaw creating a debenture debt in the sum of $250,000.00 for additions to the main Police Station Building including one additional court room, increased office space, added prisoner cells and full sized gymnasium?
Yes - 12,804
No - 4,216

Renfrew Ball Park

Shall Council pass a bylaw creating a debenture debt in the sum of $50,000.00 to erect a concrete grandstand to seat 1,200 people at Renfrew Ball Park?
Yes - 10,877
No - 6,253

Royal Alexandra Maternity Ward

Shall Council pass a bylaw creating a debenture debt in the sum of $1,035,000.00 for the erection of new maternity building at the Royal Alexandra Hospital to relieve serious over-crowding of present facilities?
Yes - 16,218
No - 1,752

Royal Alexandra Hospital

Shall Council pass a bylaw creating a debenture debt in the sum of $1,200,000.00 for additions and renovations to Royal Alexandra Hospital including improved operating rooms, laboratories, X-ray Department, cafeteria, plus renovation of plumbing in present main building?
Yes - 15,844
No - 2,060

Outdoor Pool

Shall Council pass a bylaw creating a debenture debt in the sum of $150,000.00 for the construction of an out-door swimming pool in the City?
Yes - 12,865
No - 4,461

References

Election History, City of Edmonton: Elections and Census Office
Results 1945 to 2013

1950
1950 elections in Canada
1950 in Alberta